Kingfisher (1867–1890) was an American Thoroughbred racehorse who won the 1870 Belmont Stakes.

Kingfisher was bred by Robert A. Alexander at his Woodburn Stud in Woodford County, Kentucky, Kingfisher was out of the imported mare Eltham Lass, a daughter of Kingston. Kingfisher's sire was Lexington. He was a bay stallion.

In 1868 Kingfisher was auctioned at the 1868 Woodburn Stud yearling sale. He was purchased for $490 by Woodburn's former manager, Daniel Swigert who entrusted his race conditioning to trainer Raleigh Colston Sr. In 1870, the three-year-old Kingfisher won the Belmont Stakes at New York's Jerome Park Racetrack, in which he was ridden by Edward D. Brown. Besides the Belmont, Kingfisher won the 1870 Travers Stakes, Champion Stakes, and Annual Stakes. Daniel Swigert sold the horse to August Belmont, for $15,000.

Kingfisher raced for August Belmont in 1871 but was injured in the Saratoga Cup and did not return to racing until the following year when he met with little success.

Kingfisher started a total of 13 races, winning 7 of them, with total race earnings of $26,750.

Retired to stud duty, he sired 7 stakes winners: Belinda out of Bellona, Lady Rosebery out of Lady Blessington, Duchess also out of Lady Blessington, King Crab out of Carita, King Cadmus also out of Carita, Oriole out of My Maryland, and Prince Royal out of imported Princess. Belinda, an 1885 chesnut mare, won the 1887 Colleen Stakes. Lady Rosebery, an 1878 chestnut mare, won the 1880 Champagne Stakes. Duchess, an 1881 bay mare, won the 1883 Sapling Stakes, the 1884 Ladies' Handicap, Monmouth Oaks, and Mermaid Stakes. King Crab, an 1885 bay stallion, won the 1888 Oceanview Handicap. King Cadmus, an 1889 bay stallion, won the 1891 Sapphire Stakes. Oriole, an 1874 chestnut mare, won the 1878 Maturity Stakes. Prince Royal, an 1885 chestnut stallion, won the 1888 Jerome Handicap, Stevens Stakes and Stockton Stakes.

He was the maternal grandsire of the following:

 Fides, the 1889 American Champion Three-Year-Old Filly.
 Clifford, the 1893 American Champion Three-Year-Old Male Horse and 1894 American Champion Older Male Horse
 George W. Jenkins, winner of the 1902 American Grand National

Kingfisher died on June 30, 1890 in Kentucky.

Pedigree

Sire line tree

Kingfisher
King Crab
King Cadmus
Oriole
Turco
Prince Royal
Yankee Doodle
The Mighty

Citations

References

External links
 Kingfisher's pedigree and partial racing stats

1867 racehorse births
1890 racehorse deaths
Racehorses bred in Kentucky
Racehorses trained in the United States
Belmont Stakes winners
Thoroughbred family 12-c
Byerley Turk sire line